Kevin Malone is a fictional character in the American television series The Office.

Kevin Malone may also refer to:
 Kevin Malone (baseball) (born 1957), American former baseball general manager

See also
 Kelvin Malone (1961–1999), American spree killer
 Kevin Maloney, American Transit Police officer
 Kevin P. Maloney (born 1958), American real estate developer